The César Award for Best Animated Short Film is a French film award, that was awarded by the Académie des Arts et Techniques du Cinéma from 1977 to 1990. Combined with the César Award for Best Animated Film from 2011 to 2013, this award has been fully awarded since 2014.

List of winners and nominees

1970s

1980s

1990s

2010s

2020s

See also

 List of animation awards
 César Award for Best Animated Film
 Academy Award for Best Animated Feature
 Academy Award for Best Animated Short Film

References

External links
 Official website 
 César Award for Best Animated Short at AlloCiné

Short Animated Film
Animated short film awards
Awards established in 2014
2014 establishments in France